"The One Where Rachel Finds Out" is the 24th and final episode of Friends first season. It first aired on the NBC network in the United States on May 18, 1995.

Plot
Joey participates in a fertility study at NYU. Part of the study requires that he abstain from sex for two weeks, impacting his relationship with new girlfriend Melanie (co-owner of a fruit basket company). The gang holds a barbecue to celebrate Rachel's birthday; Ross finds out he has to go to China at the last minute for an important paleontology find. He drops off a present for Rachel before he leaves.

While opening her presents (Chandler got her Travel Scrabble; Joey got her an Oh, the Places You'll Go! by Dr. Seuss), Rachel finds Ross gave her a cameo pin she had admired several months ago. Chandler accidentally lets slip that Ross is in love with her. Rachel rushes to the airport to talk to Ross, but is unable to reach him before he gets on his flight. Rachel then spends the next few days deciding what to do, and on the night Ross is due to arrive back from China, even tries going on a date with another man to take her mind off it. However, when she keeps fantasizing about Ross during the date, she finally decides to give their relationship a chance and rushes off to greet him at the airport. Unbeknownst to her, Ross has started dating another woman while in China.

Reception
In the original broadcast, the episode was viewed by 31.3 million viewers.

Sam Ashurst from Digital Spy ranked it #70 on their ranking of the 236 Friends episodes, and called it a popular episode with a strong cliffhanger ending.

Telegraph & Argus ranked it the 10th best episode on their ranking of all 236 Friends episodes.

References

1995 American television episodes
Friends (season 1) episodes